USS Holly was a lighthouse tender borrowed by the U.S. Navy from the U.S. Commerce Department during World War I and armed as a patrol craft. Holly was used to patrol the waters near Norfolk, Virginia. Post-war she was returned to the Commerce Department.

Service history
The first ship to be so named by the Navy, Holly, a wood and steel lighthouse tender, was built in Baltimore, Maryland, in 1881, and was owned by the Department of Commerce, Lighthouse Service, until being taken over by the Navy 15 April 1917. She served in the 5th Naval District, operating from Norfolk, Virginia, on general and patrol duty during the balance of World War I. The steamer was returned to the Lighthouse Service by Executive order dated 1 July 1919.

See also 
 USLHT Holly

References
 

Ships built in Baltimore
World War I patrol vessels of the United States
Patrol vessels of the United States Navy
1881 ships
Ships of the United States Lighthouse Service
Lighthouse tenders of the United States